Thliptoceras fulvimargo is a moth in the family Crambidae. It was described by William Warren in 1895. It is found in China (Guangxi), India (Khasia Hills) and Myanmar.

The wingspan is about 25 mm. The wings are smoky fuscous.

References

Moths described in 1895
Pyraustinae